The Thirteenth Federal Electoral District of Chiapas (XII Distrito Electoral Federal de Chiapas) is one of the 300 Electoral Districts into which Mexico is divided for the purpose of elections to the federal Chamber of Deputies and one of 12 such districts in the state of Chiapas. It was first contested at the 2018 Mexican general election.

It elects one deputy to the lower house of Congress for each three-year legislative period, by means of the first past the post system.

Members 

 Maricruz Roblero Gordillo
 Luis Armando Melgar Bravo

References 

Federal electoral districts of Mexico
Government of Chiapas
2018 establishments in Mexico
Constituencies established in 2018